The large-eared vole (Alticola macrotis) is a species of rodent in the family Cricetidae.
It is found in Mongolia and the Russian Federation.

References

Further reading

Alticola
Mammals of Mongolia
Mammals of Russia
Mammals described in 1862
Taxonomy articles created by Polbot